Mendocino may refer to:


Geology
 Mendocino Fracture Zone, a seismic feature off the coast of Cape Mendocino, California
 Mendocino Triple Junction, a point where three tectonic plates meet

Music
 Mendocino (album), by the Sir Douglas Quintet, or its title track
 "(Talk to Me of) Mendocino", a song on the album Kate & Anna McGarrigle

Places
 Mendocino County, California, United States
 Mendocino, California, a town in Mendocino County
 Cape Mendocino, a cape located in Humboldt County, California
 Mendocino National Forest
 Mendocino Range, a part of the Pacific Coast Mountain Range
 Mendocino Township, a former civil township in Sonoma County, California

Other uses
 Mendocino Brewing Company, located in Ukiah, Mendocino County, California
 Mendocino Unified School District, serving Mendocino County, California
 Mendocino, a code name for the second generation Intel Celeron processor
 Mendocino AVA, a California wine region

See also
Torrontés Mendocino, a grape subvariety
Mendocino County wine, produced in California
Mendocino Ridge AVA, a California wine region